Keiron Gareth Self (born 1971 in Newport, Wales) is a British actor and writer best known for playing Roger Bailey, Jr. in the BBC sitcom My Family. His other acting credits include Casualty, Lucky Bag and playing PC Claude Cox in the sitcom High Hopes. He has also provided the voice of Police Chief Llunos in the BBC radio production of Aberystwyth Mon Amour.  His writing credits include the 2000 sketch show TV To Go, Lucky Bag, The Story of Tracy Beaker and the 2001 sketch show Velvet Soup. His theatre performances also include the recent role of Bob Acres in the restoration comedy The Rivals.

References

External

1971 births
Living people
Welsh male television actors
Welsh television writers
British male television writers
People from Newport, Wales
Alumni of the Royal Welsh College of Music & Drama